The 2008 United Kingdom Budget, officially known as Budget 2008: Stability and opportunity: building a strong, sustainable future, was formally delivered by Alistair Darling in the House of Commons on 12 March 2008. It was the first Budget to be delivered by Darling, who had been appointed Chancellor of the Exchequer the previous June.

Among the changes from the previous year were that taxes on alcohol, cigarettes and high-polluting cars would be increased. Child Benefit would be raised to £20 a week from April 2009; winter fuel payments for pensioners would also be increased. All long-term recipients of Incapacity Benefit would have to attend work capacity programmes from April 2010.

The growth of the national economy was expected to slow down to approximately 2% in 2008, down from 3% in the previous year.

Details

Taxes

Spending

Notes

External links

 Complete Budget 2008 Report
 Speech delivered 12 March 2008

Budget
United Kingdom budgets
United Kingdom budget
March 2008 events in the United Kingdom